"Had It Coming" is a song by Canadian singer-songwriter Matthew Good. It was released as the lead single from Good's sixth solo album, Arrows of Desire. The song was first released to Canadian radio on May 27, 2013 and was officially released on ITunes on May 28. Upon release, the song reached #1 on the ITunes Top Rock Songs chart in Canada. On June 4, an Extended Version of the single was released, featuring the song "We're Long Gone".

Description
In an interview with The Huffington Post Canada, Good gave a description of what the song is about:

"It's exactly what it sounds like. In the first part I talk about myself. It's a first-person kind of thing. It's not 'I had it coming' in a bad way. It's just like, 'Oh finally. It's about time I had it coming.' Then in the second verse I talk about everyday ordinary people caught in the 9-to-5. And they slip into the dream of those pressures being released from them. That's the whole reference to breathing under water. You can find that you can breathe. And I go on to 'you've had it coming' 'Yay.' And then I go on to say that we've all had it coming — might as well put it all together in one big fuckin' package — and the song's over. That's pretty much it."

Music video
The music video for "Had It Coming" was filmed and directed by David Spearing. It features Good walking down the streets of London, England to go perform a show at a club. It is the first music video released for a Matthew Good single since "It's Been a While Since I Was Your Man" in 2004.

References

2013 singles
Matthew Good songs
Songs written by Matthew Good
2013 songs